Weedsport Junior/Senior High School is a public, secondary school located in Weedsport, New York, Cayuga County.  The facility was constructed in 1957 and then expanded in 1967 to include a new cafeteria, swimming pool, and additional classrooms.

Student body
Approximately 96% of the student population is white/non-Hispanic, with 1% Asian, 1% Black/non-Hispanic, <1% Hispanic, and <1% American Indian.

Faculty and staff
In the Weedsport Central School District, the student-teacher ratio is 13:1. 78% of the teachers in the school district hold a Master's degree and 22% hold a Bachelor's degree.  The average teaching experience is 15 years.

Academic performance
During the 2004-05 school year, student attendance was 96%, which was 3% higher than the New York State average for that school year.

The proportion of Weedsport High School students who pass New York State Regents Exams is generally higher than the statewide averages.  In 2005, the following percentage of students passed the given regents exams (New York state averages are listed in parenthesis):
 Mathematics A - 93% (78%)
 Mathematics B - 64% (66%)
 English - 98% (77%)
 Living Environment - 95% (76%)
 Physics - 88% (81%)
 Chemistry - 84% (72%)
 Earth Science - 72% (72%)

Athletics
Weedsport is known for having a prestigious athletic program, especially their football program. The Weedsport Varsity Football team won the 2004 New York State Class D Championship 22-21 over Tuckahoe. Their main athletic rival is Port Byron.

The Johnny Green
The Johnny Green is the student newspaper. Named in honor of legendary coach John Skvorak, The Johnny Green moved to an online format in Fall 2012.

References

New York State Education Dept. 2006-07 Report

External links
 Weedsport Central School District
 The Johnny Green

Public middle schools in New York (state)
Public high schools in New York (state)
Schools in Cayuga County, New York